Sargon Lazar Slewa is an Iraqi politician. An ethnic Assyrian, he belonged to the Assyrian Democratic Movement. He served as Minister of Environment of the Republic of Iraq from 2010 to 2014, during the second Al-Maliki government, and as a Vice President of the United Nations Environment Assembly.

Corruption 
In November 2015, Slewa was sentenced to two years in prison and ordered to pay a fine of around $280,000 on graft-related charges.

References 

Assyrian politicians
Government ministers of Iraq

Living people
Year of birth missing (living people)
Iraqi politicians